Thomas Littleton Powys, 4th Baron Lilford (18 March 1833 – 17 June 1896), was a British aristocrat and ornithologist.

Life
Lilford was the eldest son of Thomas Powys, 3rd Baron Lilford, and Mary Elizabeth Fox, daughter of Henry Vassall-Fox, 3rd Baron Holland. He was born in Stanhope Street, Mayfair, London, on 18 March 1833.

He succeeded his father as fourth baron in 1861. Lilford was one of the eight founders of the British Ornithologists' Union in 1858 and its president from 1867 until his death. He was also the first President of the Northamptonshire Natural History Society.

Lilford travelled widely, especially around the Mediterranean and his extensive collection of birds was maintained in the grounds of Lilford Hall, his second residence was Bank Hall in Bretherton, Lancashire, which he inherited from his father (3rd Baron Lilford), who inherited it from George Anthony Legh Keck. He inherited the Holland Estates from his mother's family.
Until 1891, his aviaries featured birds from around the globe, including rheas, kiwis, pink-headed ducks and a pair of free-flying bearded vultures.
He was responsible for the introduction of the little owl into England in the 1880s.

He wrote about birds including Notes on the Birds of Northamptonshire and Neighbourhood (1895) and Coloured Figures of the Birds of the British Islands, which was completed by Osbert Salvin after his death.

A species of European lizard, Podarcis lilfordi, is named in his honour.

Family

Lord Lilford married, firstly, Emma Elizabeth Brandling, daughter of Robert William Brandling, in 1859. After her death in 1884 he married, secondly, Clementina Georgina, daughter of Ker Baillie-Hamilton, in 1885.

He died in June 1896, aged 63, and was succeeded in the barony by his eldest son from his first marriage, John.
Lady Lilford died in 1929.
A metal plaque commemorating a "Cedar of Atlantica" planted by Lady Lilford in 1897, was found in 2005 and is displayed in the visitor centre at Bank Hall.

Bibliography 
  (in 7 volumes, 1885–1897)

Notes

References

Sources

Kidd, Charles, Williamson, David (editors). Debrett's Peerage and Baronetage (1990 edition). New York: St Martin's Press, 1990.

1833 births
1896 deaths
British ornithologists
Fellows of the Zoological Society of London
Thomas 4
Presidents of the British Ornithologists' Union